Bromus auleticus is a species of flowering plant in the brome tribe, Bromeae, of the grass family Poaceae. It is native to the Pampas of northern Argentina, Uruguay and southern Brazil. It is in the process of being domesticated for fodder use.

References

auleticus
Flora of Northeast Argentina
Flora of Northwest Argentina
Flora of South Brazil
Flora of Uruguay
Plants described in 1829